The 2013 FIRS Men's Roller Hockey World Cup was the 41st edition of the FIRS Roller Hockey World Cup. It was held in Luanda and Namibe (today Moçâmedes), Angola from 20 to 28 September 2013. This is the first Roller Hockey World Cup organized in Africa.

Venues
Luanda and Namibe were the host cities of the tournament.

Matches
All times are West Africa Time (UTC+1).

Qualification
The teams to play the World Cup are the first thirteen countries at the last World Cup, and the first three countries qualified at last B World Cup. The group arrangement is already defined.

Group stage

Group A

Group B

Group C

Group D

Knockout stage

Championship

Quarter-finals

Semi-finals

3rd-4th place

Final

5th–8th playoff

9th–16th playoff

13th–16th playoff

Final standing

References

Roller Hockey World Cup
CIRH World Championship
A
FIRS World Championship